Mark Gunn is an American screenwriter and producer based in Pasadena, California who wrote the screenplays for the films Journey 2: The Mysterious Island and Brightburn.

Life and career
Mark Gunn was born in St. Louis, Missouri. He is the cousin of screenwriter James Gunn, actor and political writer Matt Gunn, former Senior Vice President of Artisan Entertainment Patrick Gunn, actor Sean Gunn, and writer Brian Gunn.

Gunn is known for Journey 2: The Mysterious Island (2012), Bring It On Again (2004) and 2gether (2000).
He was elected to the Writers Guild of America West Board of Directors in 2006. He attended St. Louis University High School and the College of the Holy Cross in Worcester, Massachusetts.

Filmography

References

External links

Living people
American screenwriters
American producers
Year of birth missing (living people)